NCAA Final Four 2001 is a video game developed by 989 Sports and published by Sony Computer Entertainment for the PlayStation and PlayStation 2 in 2000.

Reception

The PlayStation version received "mixed" reviews, while the PlayStation 2 version received "generally unfavorable reviews", according to the review aggregation website Metacritic.

Rob Smolka of Next Generation said of the latter console version, "Oh well, there's always next year (or the year after that, or the year after that...)."

References

External links
 

2000 video games
Basketball video games
NCAA video games
North America-exclusive video games
PlayStation (console) games
PlayStation 2 games
Video games developed in the United States
Video games set in 2001
Video games set in the United States